Perematkino is a rural locality (a village) in Karinskoye Rural Settlement, Alexandrovsky District, Vladimir Oblast, Russia. The population was 22 as of 2010. There are 5 streets.

Geography 
Perematkino is located on the Molokcha River, 33 km southwest of Alexandrov (the district's administrative centre) by road. Pesochnaya is the nearest rural locality.

References 

Rural localities in Alexandrovsky District, Vladimir Oblast